Antonio Francesco Weiss (born September 28, 1966) is a policymaker, financier, and former publisher. He is currently a senior fellow at the Mossavar-Rahmani Center for Business and Government at Harvard’s Kennedy School.

Weiss served as the Counselor to the Secretary of the US Treasury from January 2015 to January 2017 where he advised on domestic and international issues, including financial markets, regulatory reform, job creation, and fostering broad-based economic growth. In 2016, Weiss led the Obama Administration’s response to the financial crisis in Puerto Rico and helped broker the Puerto Rico Oversight, Management, and Economic Stability Act. He was previously head of investment banking for Lazard, a global financial advisory and asset management firm. He is a former publisher and senior editor of the Paris Review, where he apprenticed to founder and editor George Plimpton.

Education
Weiss attended Yale College and received his MBA at Harvard Business School, where he was a Baker Scholar and a Loeb Fellow in Finance.

Banking career
Weiss joined Lazard in New York in 1994 and became a partner in 1998. From 2001 to 2009, Weiss was based in Paris, France where he served as a vice chairman of European investment banking, and subsequently global head of mergers and acquisitions. In 2009, Weiss moved back to the U.S. and was named the global head of investment banking for Lazard.

U.S. Treasury
After his nomination to be undersecretary of domestic finance at the Treasury Department was opposed by Senator Elizabeth Warren, Weiss served the Treasury as an unofficial advisor, beginning in early 2015. In 2016, as a public debt crisis brought Puerto Rico to the brink of default, Weiss helped to broker a U.S. law to allow the commonwealth to restructure its $70 billion in debt under the supervision of an oversight board. Weiss testified before both chambers of Congress to explain PROMESA and the Obama Administration's plan to address the Puerto Rican debt crisis. The law was criticized on the right by fiscal conservatives unhappy with the possible cost to U.S. taxpayers and on the left by advocates for workers and for Puerto Rican autonomy, but was heralded as "the only piece of major economic policy to pass Congress" to date in 2016.

After the October 15, 2014 "flash crash", Weiss led Treasury's role in the joint regulatory review of the irregularity.

In recognition of his achievements at the Treasury, he was presented the Alexander Hamilton Award, the department's highest order.

Affiliations
Weiss is a member of the Council on Foreign Relations, a director of the Volker Alliance, and a director of the French-American Foundation. Prior to joining the US Treasury, Weiss was a trustee of The Frick Collection.

Publications
Weiss co-authored the December, 2012 Center for American Progress report, “Reforming Our Tax System, Reducing Our Deficit,” which recommended a more progressive tax regime and a balanced approach to long-term
debt reduction and the May 2017 Peterson Institute report, “The Financial Stability Oversight Council: An Essential Role for the Evolving U.S. Financial System”, which discussed the importance of the Council in the face of pressure to limit its authorities. He also authored "A proposal to tax financial transactions" in January 2020, which recommends the implementation of a new financial transaction tax on assets including stocks, bonds, and derivatives, to raise revenue for the federal government.

He is a frequent contributor on public policy to various publications, including Foreign Affairs, Bloomberg, The Wall Street Journal, and The New York Times.

Personal life
Weiss married Susannah Hunnewell in 1993. He lives with their three sons in New York City. Weiss is the son of Piero Weiss and Carole Severson Weiss.

References

1966 births
Businesspeople from New York City
Harvard Business School alumni
Living people
New York (state) Democrats
United States Department of the Treasury officials
Yale College alumni